Linlithgow Rugby Football Club are an amateur Scottish Rugby Union side currently playing in East Regional League Division One.

History

The club as it is today was founded in 1970. Linlithgow RFC play their home matches at Mains Park in Linlithgow.

Honours

 Portobello Sevens
 Champions: 2022
 Hillfoots Sevens
 Champions: 1984, 1987
 Lismore Sevens
 Champions: 1988
 Penicuik Sevens
 Champions: 1992
 Holy Cross Sevens
 Champions: 1994
 Edinburgh Northern Sevens
 Champions: 1984, 1985, 1987

References

External links
 Linlithgow RFC

Rugby union in West Lothian
Scottish rugby union teams
Linlithgow